Wang Din is a tambon (sub-district) of Mueang Uttaradit District, in Uttaradit Province, Thailand. In 2015 it had a population of 4,705 people.

Administration

Central administration
The tambon is divided into 10 administrative villages (muban).

Local administration
The area of the sub-district is covered by the subdistrict administrative organization (SAO) Wang Din (องค์การบริหารส่วนตำบลวังดิน).

References

External links
Thaitambon.com on Wang Din

Tambon of Uttaradit province
Populated places in Uttaradit province